In east African folklore, the Nandi bear is a creature said to live in East Africa. It takes its name from the Nandi people who live in western Kenya, in the area the Nandi Bear is reported from. It is also known as Chemosit, Kerit, Koddoelo, Ngoloko, or Duba (which derives from the Arabic words dubb or d.abʕ / d.abuʕ for 'bear' and 'hyena' respectively). The Samburu "Nkampit" appears also to be a version of this creature.

Description
Descriptions of the Nandi bear are of a ferocious, powerfully built carnivore with high front shoulders (over four feet tall) and a sloping back. Stories of the Nandi bear state that it is fierce, nocturnal, stands on its hind legs and can kill animals. Charles William Hobley authored a diagram of its supposed foot in 1913.

The Nandi people call it "kerit". Local legend holds that the Nandi bear has reddish hair, long feet and is said to scalp people.  In 1961, Gardner Soule noted that sightings were reported in Kenya throughout the 19th century and early 20th century but it "never has been caught or identified". Sightings of the Nandi bear decreased over time. In 1905, Richard Meinertzhagen speculated that it may have been an "anthropoid ape now extinct on account of decreased rainfall."

Scientific evaluation

There is no scientific evidence that the Nandi bear exists. Alleged sightings are suggested to be misidentification of known species. 

In 1923, Charles William Andrews suggested that the Nandi bear may be a surviving representative of the extinct Chalicothere. In the 1930s Louis Leakey suggested that Nandi Bear descriptions matched that of the Chalicothere, though chalicotheres were herbivores. The Chalicothere hypothesis was later abandoned. In 2000, paleontologist Louis L. Jacobs commented that "if chalicotheres existed now, they would have been found out just like the giant forest hog was." He concluded that "if there is anything to the Nandi-bear story besides imagination, I suspect it may be the word-of-mouth description of gorillas passed across the continent from areas where they live to areas where they do not."

Zoologist Reginald Innes Pocock claimed that reports of the Nandi bear were misidentified hyenas, specifically the spotted hyena. In 1932, the British Natural History Museum stated that many reports of the Nandi Bear have "proved to have been nothing more than a spotted hyena." Vice versa, paleontologist George Gaylord Simpson commented that the Nandi bear "turned out to be in most if not all cases a ratel [honey badger], an animal which had been known to scientific zoologists since 1776."

In popular culture
The Nandi bear (spelled "Nandibear") appears as a monster in the Fighting Fantasy gamebook series.
 The Peculiar Exploits of Brigadier Ffellowes, a collection of contemporary fantasy stories by Sterling E. Lanier, includes a short story called "His Only Safari," in which the title character briefly sights a "kerit" and speculates that such creatures formed the basis for the Egyptian legends of Anubis.
 Tarzan #134 (Gold Key Comics), March 1963, features Tarzan meeting and later battling a Nandi bear which is pictured as a shaggy sloth bear-like creature with floppy ears.
 Pathfinder Roleplaying Game, a fantasy role playing game published in 2009 by Paizo Publishing, features the Chemosit, described as a "massive, shaggy beast, uses long and muscular forearms to raise itself onto its hind legs and beats its chest like a gorilla. Despite its ape-like stance, its frame is far heavier and its features more primitive". The magical beast’s special ability is the 'Brain Eater' - if the Chemosit kills an opponent with a coup de grace attack, it breaks open the creature's skull and devours what's inside.
 The daily comic panel True-Life Adventures for May 22, 1956, featured the Nandi bear.

References

East African legendary creatures
Kalenjin folklore
Mythological bears
Nandi County
Purported mammals